"Loving You Still" is a song by Canadian recording artist Tamia, recorded for her self-titled studio album (1998). Written and produced by Daryl Simmons, "Loving You Still" is pop ballad with contemporary R&B and soft latin pop influences featuring an instrumentation consisting essentially of flamenco guitars and castanets. Lyrically, the track finds the female protagonist still pines for her former love interest. The song was released as third single from Tamia in the United States, where it reached number 78 on the US Billboard Hot R&B Singles & Tracks chart.

Track listings

Credits and personnel 
Credits adapted from the liner notes of Tamia.

Backing Vocals – Chelle Davis, Liza Broome, Pamela Cork, Tanya "Tann" Smith
Bass – Ronnie Garret
Drums – Ronnie Garret
Guitar – Michael Thompson
Lead vocals – Tamia
Mixing – John Gass
Production, keyboards, writing – Daryl Simmons
Production Coordinator – Steven Meeder
Recording – Thom "TK" Kidd
Recording assistance – Kevin Lively

Charts

Weekly charts

References

1998 songs
Songs written by Daryl Simmons
Tamia songs
Song recordings produced by Daryl Simmons
Qwest Records singles
1999 singles
Contemporary R&B ballads
1990s ballads